Westphal is an unincorporated community located in Dartmouth, Nova Scotia and outside of Dartmouth, Nova Scotia. Some of Westphal is considered part of Dartmouth, Nova Scotia and some of it is considered separate from Dartmouth, Nova Scotia. The area is bound by Port Wallace in the north, Waverley Road (Route 318) in the west, Lake Major Road in the east, and Main Street (Trunk 7) in the south. The area also includes the watershed and water filtration plant for the Halifax Regional Water Commission that supplies drinking water for the residents of Dartmouth and surrounding communities east of Halifax Harbour.

History 
Westphal was originally settled by farmers in the late 1700s. Its original name was Preston Road. In 1935, the Women's Institute petitioned to rename the area after George and Philip Westphal, two brothers born near Salmon River who eventually became Royal Navy admirals and who returned to the area from time to time.

Like Woodlawn, Westphal was mostly a rural community until the building boom of the late 1940s and 1950s. St. Luke's Anglican Church began in 1948 to accommodate the growing population, originally running out of a poultry house owned by Peter Dooks on Tacoma Drive. It then moved to Admiral Westphal Elementary School for two years, before a dedicated church building was built in 1954. St. Thomas More Church was established in the early 1950s, originally near the juncture of Waverley Road and the Eastern Shore highway. After the provincial government acquired the land to build a new highway, the church moved to the corner of Main Street and Caledonia Road, where it remains today. Stevens Road United Baptist Church started in 1956, originally under the name of Westphal Mission Baptist Church. The current building was built in 1959.

Area neighbourhoods 

 Tam O'Shanter Ridge

Schools

 Elementary
 Admiral Westphal Elementary School
 Ian Forsyth Elementary School
 Junior High
 Caledonia Junior High School
 High School
 Auburn Drive High School

Run Every Street Dartmouth
 The Westphal segment of Run Every Street Dartmouth is bounded by Waverley Road (to Creelman Drive), Main Street (to Mountain Avenue), and Mountain Avenue (to Red Bridge Pond).

References

Communities in Halifax, Nova Scotia
Dartmouth, Nova Scotia